Thomas Andrew Nieto (born October 27, 1960) is an American former professional baseball catcher who played in Major League Baseball (MLB) for the St. Louis Cardinals, Montreal Expos, Minnesota Twins, and Philadelphia Phillies. Nieto is formerly the manager of the Minor League Baseball (MiLB) Rochester Red Wings, the Twins’ Triple-A affiliate. He previously served in various coaching capacities for the New York Yankees and New York Mets. A native of Artesia, California, Nieto attended Gahr High School then went on to Oral Roberts University.

Playing career 
The St. Louis Cardinals drafted Nieto in the third round of the 1981 amateur draft. He played in the World Series with the Cardinals in 1985.

Coaching career 
When Willie Randolph was named manager of the New York Mets following the  season, he named Nieto as his catching instructor on November 26, . In , Nieto switched from catching instructor to first base coach. On June 17, 2008, the Mets fired Nieto, manager Willie Randolph and pitching coach Rick Peterson.

In his first and only season in New Britain, he led the Rock Cats to a 72–69 record and a playoff berth. On October 20, 2009, Nieto was named as the new manager of the Rochester Red Wings, Minnesota's Triple-A affiliate. He replaced Stan Cliburn, whose contract was not renewed by the Twins following the 2009 season. On October 29, 2010, the Twins announced Nieto and his coaching staff would return to manage the Red Wings for the 2011 season. Following the 2011 season, Nieto was let go by the Twins organization. Nieto managed the GCL Yankees for the 2012 and 2013 seasons.

References

External links

Tom Nieto at Baseball Gauge
Tom Nieto at Ultimate Mets Database

1960 births
Living people
All-American college baseball players
American expatriate baseball players in Canada
Arkansas Travelers players
Baseball coaches from California
Baseball players from California
Cerritos Falcons baseball players
Indianapolis Indians players
Louisville Redbirds players
Major League Baseball catchers
Minnesota Twins players
Minor league baseball managers
Montreal Expos players
New York Mets coaches
New York Yankees coaches
Oral Roberts Golden Eagles baseball players
Philadelphia Phillies players
Portland Beavers players
Rochester Red Wings managers
Scranton/Wilkes-Barre Red Barons players
Sportspeople from Downey, California
St. Louis Cardinals players
Wei Chuan Dragons coaches